Jillian Nguyen is an Australian actress. She has played main roles in the 2022 film Loveland and the 2022 ABC television series Barons, as well as supporting roles in the 2020 SBS ensemble drama Hungry Ghosts and the 2022 film Millie Lies Low.

Early life and education 
Nguyen was born Nguyen Tran Huyen Dieu in a camp for Vietnamese refugees in Sungai Besi, Malaysia. Her parents had fled Vietnam separately, met in the camp in 1990 and were married, then stayed in the camp until the family was granted refugee status in Australia in 1994. Nguyen was 14 months old when the family arrived in Australia. She grew up in Melbourne, graduated from the University of Melbourne, and pursued additional acting training at Melbourne's 16th Street Actors Studio.

Career 
After acting on stage in a 2018 production of the Daniel Keene play The Serpent's Teeth, Nguyen began her screen career with a brief appearance in the 2019 film True History of the Kelly Gang. In 2020 she appeared as Sophie Tran in Hungry Ghosts, a four-episode ensemble drama about the lives of Vietnamese families in Australia that was written by Vietnamese-Australian screenwriters and starred several Vietnamese-Australian actors.

Her first larger roles came in 2022. In the science-fiction film Loveland, Nguyen played April, a nightclub singer who forms a mysterious relationship with the protagonist Jack. The New York Times called Loveland, which was released under the title Expired in the US, "an art-house fugue disguised as a genre flick". In the ABC television series Barons, about the early days of a fictional Australian surfwear company modeled after Quiksilver, Nguyen played Tracy Dwyer, the fiancée, and later wife, of the company's founder. Louise Rugendyke of the Sydney Morning Herald noted that in comparison to the rest of the main characters, Tracy is "smarter than all of them". In the film Millie Lies Low, directed by Michelle Savill, Nguyen played Carolyn, the duplicitous best friend of the main character, who was played by Ana Scotney. In a review for Screen Daily, Tara Judah noted that Nguyen was "tasked with playing a two-faced bestie in too little screen time" and criticized the director for focusing too much on the main character rather than the supporting cast.

Nguyen joined the voice cast of the animated film Scarygirl in the lead role of Arkie, with the film scheduled to be released in 2023. She also joined the cast of Shayda, directed by Noora Niasari, with whom Nguyen had previously worked on the short film Tâm.

Filmography

Film 

 True History of the Kelly Gang, 2019
 Loveland, 2022
 Millie Lies Low, 2022
 Shayda, 2023

Television 

 Hungry Ghosts, SBS, 2020
 Barons, ABC, 2022

References 

21st-century Australian actresses
1990s births
Living people
Actresses from Melbourne
Australian people of Vietnamese descent
University of Melbourne alumni